The 2014 TNM Super League was the 29th season of the Super League of Malawi, the top professional league for association football clubs in Malawi since its establishment in 1986. It started on 19 April 2014 and ended on 6 December 2014. Silver Strikers were the defending champions. Big Bullets clinched their eleventh Super League title following a 1–0 home win over Moyale Barracks on 29 November 2014.

Teams 
Fifteen teams compete in this season: the top twelve teams from the previous season and three promoted teams from the regional leagues. Airborne Rangers (Central Region Football League), Chikwawa United (Southern Region Football League) and Karonga United (Northern Region Football League) entered as the three promoted teams, instead of the three relegated teams from previous season, Mponela United, Envirom FC and Mzuzu United.

League table

References

External links
Official Website

2015
Premier League
Malawi